We Sing and Play is an EP by Baboon.  It was self-released in 1999.  Due to the band's disenchantment with their former record label (Wind-Up), they decided to release this disc without the support of a label.  The copyright notice on the back of the disc reads "No label affiliation here, just rock band."

Track listing
 "Rise" – 2:49
 "Lushlife" – 2:54
 "Angels" – 5:00
 "Endlessly" – 3:49
 "Closer" – 3:56
 "012 seconds" – 5:37
 "Show Me the Way to Go Home" (hidden track, performed by Steven Barnett's grandmother, Mable Callahan Barnett) – 0:52

All songs by Baboon.

Personnel
 Andrew Huffstetler – vocals, trombone
 Mike Rudnicki – guitar, backing vocals
 Steven Barnett – drums
 Mark Hughes – bass
 Mark Reznicek – additional snare drum (on "Rise" and "012 seconds")
 John "Corn Mo" Cunningham – rock'n'roll piano (on "Lushlife")
 Kari Luna – organ (on "Closer" and "Endlessly")
 James Henderson – mellotron (on "Angels")
 Dan Barnett – band photograph
 Ed Sherman – layout

Baboon (band) albums
1999 EPs
Albums produced by John Congleton